Pacific Air Express was an airline based in Brisbane, Queensland, Australia. It operated cargo services to Honiara, Nauru, Noumea, Port Moresby and Port Vila; and charter flights in the South Pacific area. Its main bases were Brisbane Airport and Honiara International Airport.

History 

The airline was established in 1993 by Australian expatriate Gary Clifford (Managing Director/CEO) and a business partner from the Solomon Islands. The airline was originally based in Honiara but relocated due to civil unrest in 1999. It had 35 employees as of March 2007. In 2021 it's wet lease agreement with Qantas Freight on the Melbourne to Perth route ended, being replaced with Express Freighters Australia Airbus A321-200P2Fs.

Fleet 
In October 2021 the airline's final aircraft (a Boeing 757-200 registered VH-PQA) left Australia. The airline owns a second Boeing 757-200 (registration N314ST, msn 22211) but it remains in storage in Budapest, having never actually flown to Australia. The airline appears now to be dormant.

Previously operated
Beechcraft 200 King Air (1993 - 1994)
Boeing 737-300QC (1995 - 1996)
Boeing 727-200F (1996 - 2001)
Antonov An-12 (2002 - 2005)
Boeing 727-100C (2005 - 2007)
Boeing 727-200F (2007 - 2008) 
Boeing 737-300F (2008 - 2016)
Boeing 757-200PCF (2018 - 2021)

References

External links 
Pacific Air Express

Defunct airlines of Australia
Airlines established in 1993
Airlines disestablished in 2021
Australian companies established in 1993
Companies based in Brisbane